Louisiana's 32nd State Senate district is one of 39 districts in the Louisiana State Senate. It has been represented by Republican Glen Womack since 2020, succeeding term-limited fellow Republican Neil Riser.

Geography
District 32 covers a massive swath of Central Louisiana and Acadiana, including all of Caldwell, Catahoula, Franklin, and LaSalle Parishes, as well as parts of Avoyelles, Concordia, Ouachita, Rapides, Richland, and West Feliciana Parishes. Towns entirely or partially within the district include Jonesville, Winnsboro, Jena, Ferriday, Vidalia, and St. Francisville.

The district is located entirely within Louisiana's 5th congressional district, and overlaps with the 15th, 17th, 18th, 19th, 20th, 21st, 22nd, 27th, 28th, and 62nd districts of the Louisiana House of Representatives.

At over 4,000 square miles, it is the largest Senate district in Louisiana.

Recent election results
Louisiana uses a jungle primary system. If no candidate receives 50% in the first round of voting, when all candidates appear on the same ballot regardless of party, the top-two finishers advance to a runoff election.

2019

2015

2011

Federal and statewide results in District 32

References

Louisiana State Senate districts
Avoyelles Parish, Louisiana
Caldwell Parish, Louisiana
Catahoula Parish, Louisiana
Concordia Parish, Louisiana
Franklin Parish, Louisiana
LaSalle Parish, Louisiana
Ouachita Parish, Louisiana
Rapides Parish, Louisiana
Richland Parish, Louisiana
West Feliciana Parish, Louisiana